Richard Gerard Long, 4th Viscount Long,   (30 January 1929 – 13 June 2017) was a British peer and Conservative politician.

Life and career
Born in London, the second son of Richard Long, 3rd Viscount Long, he was educated at Harrow and served with the 1st and 2nd Battalions of the Wiltshire Regiment from 1947 to 1949. His elder brother, Walter Reginald Basil, had died in Greece in 1941 during World War II and Long succeeded to his father's title in 1967.

In 1974, he entered politics as an Opposition Whip and was then a Lord-in-waiting (senior Government whip) from 1979 to 1997.

Long was appointed a Commander of the Order of the British Empire (CBE) in the 1993 New Year Honours.

Marriages and family
Viscount Long lived for many years at Steeple Ashton Manor, and later at The Island, Newquay, Cornwall, a house on a rock linked to the mainland by a private suspension bridge.

He was married three times and had three children by his first wife, Margaret (1928–2016).
 Hon. Sarah Long (b.1958)
 James Richard Long (b.1960), 5th Viscount Long
 Hon. Charlotte Long (1965–1984), an actress, who was killed in a car crash on 6 October 1984 at the age of 18.

He died on 13 June 2017 at the age of 88. His funeral service was held at St Mary's Church, Steeple Ashton, on 29 June 2017. He was succeeded by his son James as 5th Viscount Long.

Further reading 
Inheriting the Earth: The Long Family's 500 Year Reign in Wiltshire; Cheryl Nicol

References

External links

1929 births
2017 deaths
Commanders of the Order of the British Empire
Viscounts in the Peerage of the United Kingdom
People educated at Harrow School
Richard
Conservative Party (UK) Baronesses- and Lords-in-Waiting
Wiltshire Regiment officers
People from Wiltshire
Younger sons of viscounts

Long